The 1963–64 season was Manchester United's 62nd season in the Football League, and their 19th consecutive season in the top division of English football. United failed to win any major trophies this season, but they made a strong challenge for the three major prizes, finishing second in the league, reaching the semi-finals of the FA Cup and the quarter-finals of the European Cup Winners' Cup. A notable debutant this season was 17-year-old Northern Irish forward George Best, whose debut came in the league against West Bromwich Albion on 14 September 1963. The highly promising Best turned out a total of 17 times for United that season, scoring four goals. Striker Denis Law had an outstanding season, scoring 30 goals in the league and a total of 46 in all competitions.

FA Charity Shield

First Division

FA Cup

European Cup Winners' Cup

Squad statistics

References

Manchester United F.C. seasons
Manchester United